Madonna of the Storm is a 1913 American drama film directed by  D. W. Griffith.

Cast
 Lillian Gish as The Mother
 Charles Hill Mailes as The Father
 J. Jiquel Lanoe as The Clubman
 W. C. Robinson as The Waiter
 Harry Carey

See also
 Harry Carey filmography
 D. W. Griffith filmography
 Lillian Gish filmography

External links

1913 films
Films directed by D. W. Griffith
1913 short films
American silent short films
American black-and-white films
1913 drama films
Silent American drama films
1910s American films
1910s English-language films
American drama short films